Robert, Rob, or Bob Phillips or Philips may refer to:

Arts and entertainment
Robert Phillips (actor) (1925-2018), American actor
Robert Phillips (poet) (born 1938), American poet and professor of English
Bob Phillips (born 1951), American television journalist
Robert Phillips (guitarist) (born 1953), American classical guitarist

Politics and law
Robert Needham Philips (1815–1890), British Member of Parliament for Bury
Robert Phillips (politician) (born 1956), American state legislator in Rhode Island
Robert K. Phillips, American trial attorney

Science and medicine
Robert Allan Phillips (1906–1976), American physician and research scientist during World War II
Robert A. Phillips (fl. 1965–2007), Canadian medical researcher
Rob B. Phillips (fl. 2000s–present), American biophysicist

Others
Robert Edwin Phillips (1895–1968), English army officer, recipient of the Victoria Cross
Bob Phillips (basketball) (1917–1992), American basketball player
Robert L. Phillips (born 1955), American technology executive, founder of Nomis Solutions
Robert Allen Phillips (born 1968), American professor of management

See also
Bert Phillips (disambiguation)
Sir Robert Phelips (c. 1586–1638), English Member of Parliament
Robert Phillip (died 1647), Scottish Roman Catholic priest